Ally Ong (born 14 September 1943) is a Malaysian sports shooter. He competed in the mixed skeet event at the 1976 Summer Olympics.

References

1943 births
Living people
Malaysian male sport shooters
Olympic shooters of Malaysia
Shooters at the 1976 Summer Olympics
Place of birth missing (living people)
Asian Games medalists in shooting
Shooters at the 1974 Asian Games
Asian Games bronze medalists for Malaysia
Medalists at the 1974 Asian Games